Abu Ayyub al-Masri (translation: "Father of Ayyub the Egyptian"; 1967 – 18 April 2010), also known as Abu Hamza al-Muhajir (translation: "Father of Hamza the immigrant"), born Abdel Moneim Ezz El-Din Ali Al-Badawi, was the leader of Al-Qaeda in Iraq during the Iraqi insurgency, following the death of Abu Musab al-Zarqawi in June 2006. He was war minister of the Islamic State of Iraq from 2006–2010 and prime minister of the Islamic State of Iraq from 2009–2010. He was killed during a raid on his safehouse on 18 April 2010.

Entry in militant groups

Abdel Moneim Ezz El-Din Ali Al-Badawi was born in Kafr Al Asar, Sharqia Governorate, Egypt. He joined the Muslim Brotherhood and, according to General Caldwell, joined Ayman al-Zawahiri's Egyptian Islamic Jihad in 1982, where he "worked with Zawahiri." Al-Masri went to Afghanistan in 1999, where he attended Osama bin Laden's al-Farouk camp, becoming an expert with explosives.

Marriage

al-Masri entered Yemen using a fake passport under the name "Yussef Haddad Labib" and taught in village schools. He married Hasna Yahia Ali Hussein, a native of Yemen, in the capital Sanaa in 1998 and they had three children. Hasna was arrested in the same April 18 operation in the Lake Tharthar area, south of Baghdad, in which her husband was killed. "I only found out that he was Abu Ayyub al-Masri after the death of Abu Musab al-Zarqawi," Hasna subsequently stated, referring to the Jordanian commander of Al-Qaeda in Iraq, who was killed in a 2006 US air raid and replaced by her husband. Hasna asserted that her husband had always been a "secretive character." In 2011, his wife Hasna was sentenced to death in Iraq.

Move to Iraq

After the American invasion of Afghanistan, al-Masri went to Iraq via the United Arab Emirates in 2002, according to the subsequent account given by his widow. He lived initially in Baghdad's Karrada, then in the Amiriya fainal, and then al-Jadida, where he took charge of al-Qaeda's operations in the southern part of the country. The United States military said that Masri "helped draw other insurgent groups into al-Qaeda’s fold." DefenseLINK News reported that Masri "helped establish the Baghdad cell of al-Qaeda in early 2003". Soon after, he "worked the ‘rat line’ down the Euphrates River Valley supplying suicide bombers via Syria." After the US-led invasion, the family left Baghdad for Diyala to the north. Hasna related "The two-storey house where we were was hit in a US air raid. Then, one of the men was killed but my husband and I were able to escape to Fallujah" [the Sunni Arab town west of Baghdad that was at the time a bastion of the anti-US insurgency]. al-Masri participated in the major 2004 battle of Fallujah. After US troops stormed the town in November 2004, the family moved again, this time to the town of Abu Ghraib, on the western outskirts of the capital. In 2007, al-Masri and his family moved to the Lake Tharthar area. "We were changing houses the whole time, right up to his death," claimed Hasna.

Killings allegedly committed by al-Masri 

A claim posted on an Islamic website said that Abu Hamza al-Muhajir personally killed two U.S. Army soldiers who disappeared after an ambush in Iraq on 16 June 2006, as a means of "making his presence felt." Their bodies were later found mutilated and booby-trapped in Yusufiyah, Iraq, on 19 June 2006.

On 20 September 2006, Abu Hamza al-Muhajir claimed responsibility for personally killing Turkish hostage Murat Yuce, whose execution was captured in a video first released in August 2004. Murat Yuce was killed with three gunshot wounds to the head. He had been kidnapped in late July 2004, along with Turk co-worker Aytullah Gezmen, who was released in September 2004.

Rise

Abu Ayyub al-Masri was on the list of persons wanted by the coalition forces and Iraqi authorities in 2005, or possibly earlier.

The Mujahideen Shura Council, which included Al-Qaeda in Iraq and other Iraqi insurgent groups, named Abu Hamza al-Muhajir as their new emir in June 2006. However, National Security Advisor Stephen Hadley said, "It’s not clear at this point who is in (control). We’ve seen a number of different reports … In our view it’s not yet settled."

After Abu Omar al-Baghdadi's alleged capture by the American forces on 7 March 2007, the media started reporting about al-Masri's standing in the insurgency, and a video tape was released to the media in which al-Masri proclaims al-Baghdadi "the ruler of believers", with Iraqi Qaeda fighters under his command. al-Masri, as Abu Hamza al-Muhajir, was denoted as "al-Zarqawi's successor" by the Coalition and the Bush administration posted a bounty on him, later raised to $25 million.

In 2008, the bounty was reduced to $100,000, with Central Command spokesman Jamie Graybeal stating that "The current assessment, based on a number of factors, shows that [al-Masri] is not ... an effective leader of al Qaeda in Iraq as he was last year," although, as the spokesman stated, "for security reasons," he couldn't go into detail about the assessment. The reduction of reward money knocked al-Masri off the U.S. State Department "Rewards for Justice" program list and placed him on a Department of Defense list for people with lower bounties.

On October 24, 2008 an interview with Abu Ayyub al-Masri was released by the Al-Furqan Institute for Media Production. The audio runs for a total of 44 minutes. At one point he said his group carried out its "last operation in Britain, a good part of which was launched on the airport, and the rest was not carried out due to a mistake made by one of the brothers.". There is support for this claim as just before the two men set off from Loch Lomond to Glasgow airport Kafeel Ahmed sent a text message to his brother Sabeel in Liverpool telling him to go to an email account. Secondly Bilal Abdulla (the other bomber) addressed his will to Abu Omar al-Baghdadi and Abu Hamza al-Muhajir, “Minister of War,” who were the leader and deputy leader of al-Qaeda in Iraq. There were reports that al-Muhajir recruited people for the plot between 2004 and 2005.

Reports of death

'Abu Hamza al-Muhajir' was erroneously reported killed during a US raid in Haditha in October 2006, and in an "internal battle between militants" in May 2007. The person killed in the latter report was actually Muharib Abdul Latif al-Jubouri, a senior member of Al-Qaida in Iraq and the "public relations minister" of al-Baghdadi's shadow cabinet.

Confirmed death

On April 18, 2010, Abu Ayyub al-Masri was killed in a joint American and Iraqi operation near Tikrit. The coalition forces believed al-Masri to be wearing a suicide vest and proceeded cautiously. After the lengthy exchange of fire and bombing of the house, the Iraqi troops stormed inside and found two women still alive, one of whom was al-Masri's wife, identified as al-Masri, Abu Omar al-Baghdadi, and al-Baghdadi's son. A suicide vest was found on al-Masri's corpse, according to the Iraqi Army.
Iraqi Prime Minister Nouri al-Maliki announced the killings of Abu Omar al-Baghdadi and Abu Ayyub al-Masri at a news conference in Baghdad and showed reporters photographs of their corpses. "The attack was carried out by ground forces which surrounded the house, and also through the use of missiles," Maliki said. "During the operation computers were seized with e-mails and messages to the two biggest terrorists, Osama bin Laden and [his deputy] Ayman al-Zawahiri," Maliki added. U.S. forces commander Gen. Raymond Odierno praised the operation. "The death of these terrorists is potentially the most significant blow to al-Qaeda in Iraq since the beginning of the insurgency," he said. "There is still work to do but this is a significant step forward in ridding Iraq of terrorists."

On April 25, 2010, a four-page announcement by the Islamic State of Iraq organisation was posted on a militant website early Sunday confirming the deaths of al-Masri and al-Baghdadi. The ISI's shariah minister, Abu al-Walid Abd al-Wahhab al-Mashadani, stated in the announcement that the two leaders were attending a meeting when "enemy forces" engaged them in battle and launched an airstrike on their location. The announcement, in an apparent reference to the previous Friday's extensive bomb attacks, claimed that the "Crusaders and the Shi'ites will exploit the incident to improve the image of Iraqi security services and give the enemy alliance an 'illusory' victory after the mass-casualty incidents carried out by the ISI in Baghdad."

US Vice-President Joe Biden stated that the deaths of the top two al-Qaeda figures in Iraq are "potentially devastating" blows to the terror network there and proof that Iraqi security forces are gaining ground.

On May 14, 2010, al-Nasser Lideen Illah Abu Suleiman replaced al-Masri as war minister of the Islamic State of Iraq.

See also

Abu Yaqub al-Masri

Notes

References

1967 births
2010 deaths
Assassinated al-Qaeda leaders
Deaths by firearm in Iraq
Egyptian al-Qaeda members
Egyptian Islamic Jihad
Egyptian Islamists
Egyptian Muslim Brotherhood members
Egyptian Sunni Muslims
Fugitives
Fugitives wanted by Iraq
Leaders of Islamic terror groups
Members of al-Qaeda in Iraq
People from Sharqia Governorate
Salafi jihadists